The Sudanese Armed Forces (SAF) are the military forces of the Republic of the Sudan. In 2011, IISS estimated the regular forces' numbers at  personnel, while in 2016–2017, the Rapid Support Forces had  members participating in the Yemeni Civil War (of which  returned to Sudan by October 2019).

History 
The origins of the Sudanese army can be traced to six battalions of black soldiers from southern Sudan, recruited by the British during the reconquest of Sudan in 1898. Sudan officially became the Anglo-Egyptian Sudan in 1899. The highest-ranking British officer in Egypt, known as the Sirdar, also served as Governor General of the Sudan. In 1922, after nationalist riots stimulated by Egyptian leader Saad Zaghloul, Egypt was granted independence by the United Kingdom. The Egyptians wanted more oversight in the Sudan and created specialized units of Sudanese auxiliaries within the Egyptian Army called Al-Awtirah. This became the nucleus of the modern Sudanese Army.

The British Army formed the Sudan Defence Force (SDF) as local auxiliaries in 1925. The SDF consisted of a number of separate regiments. Most were made up of Muslim soldiers and stationed in the north, but the Equatoria Corps in the south was composed of Christians. During the Second World War, the SDF augmented allied forces engaging Italians in Ethiopia. They also served during the Western Desert Campaign, supporting Free French and Long Range Desert Group operations at Kufra and Jalo oases in the Libyan Desert. "In 1947, the Sudanese military schools were closed, and the number of Sudanese troops was reduced to 7,570." In 1948, the first Arab-Israeli War broke out. Sudanese Colonel Harold Saleh Al-Malik selected 250 combat-seasoned soldiers who had seen action in World War II. They arrived in Cairo to participate in a parade and were then dispatched to various units of the Egyptian army. This was a grave mistake, for the Sudanese had fought together in World War II and this broke unit cohesion. The decision was indicative of Egyptian military planners of the period. Forty-three Sudanese were killed in action in the 1948 Arab-Israeli War. In 1953, the British and the new Egyptian government reached an agreement that Sudan was to be put on the path of independence. General Ahmed Mohammed became Sudan's first army chief in August 1954. This is significant for the Sudanese, for it was the first time it had an independent army that was not governed by Britain or Egypt.

In July 1951, Maj Gen Lashmer Whistler, Commandant of the Sudan Defence Force, wrote in British Army Review, (Issue 6, July 1951) that at that point the SDF comprised four infantry/camel units, a signals regiment, an AA artillery regiment and other units. In March 1954 British troops in the Sudan consisted of one battalion stationed in Khartoum, reporting ultimately to the Governor-General. The Governor-General's military commander was the Major-General Commanding British Troops in the Sudan, who was also Commandant of the Sudan Defence Force. In this post from 1950 onward was Major General Reginald 'Cully' Scoons. The last British troops, 1st Battalion Royal Leicestershire Regiment, left the country on 16 August 1955. All of the British troops were gone by the end of August 1955.

The Equatoria Corps mutinied at Torit on 18 August 1955, just before independence, prompting the formation of the Anyanya guerilla movement and the First Sudanese Civil War. No. 2 Company of the Equatoria Corps had been ordered to make ready to move to the north for ceremonies marking the exit of the last British troops, but instead of obeying, the troops mutinied, along with other Southern soldiers across the South in Juba, Yei, Yombo, and Maridi. Thousands of Northern troops were flown in to suppress the mutiny, and by the month's end, the Equatoria Corps had been "eliminated."

Independence 
"In the aftermath of the 1954 Torit mutiny, Northern servicemen who had left the forces after the Second World War were allowed to return to the colours, and additional recruitment took place."

On independence in 1956, the army was "regarded as a highly trained, competent... force, but its character changed in succeeding years." Army officers, however, had begun considering involvement in politics by the eve of independence. Numbers began expanding before independence, reaching 12,000 personnel by 1959, and leveled off at nearly 50,000 in 1972. After independence, the military -particularly the educated officer corps- became more and more politically involved; soldiers associated themselves with parties and movements across the political spectrum." On November 17, 1958, the army's two senior generals, Major General Ibrahim Abboud, the armed forces commander, and Ahmad Abd al Wahab, seized power in a military coup. "The coup in the Sudan, far from being a take-over.. by the army, was a hand-over to the army. It was a coup by courtesy.. in response to the demand for emergency measures.." by the head of the government, Abdallah Khalil.

The First Sudanese Civil War broke out in a series of actions in the south in late 1963 and early 1964. Attacks on police posts and convoys began in September 1963, and the higher-profile early attack on the Armed Forces came in January 1964, when rebels attacked the barracks at Wau, Sudan. President Abboud was forced to step down following demonstrations which began in mid-1964.

During 1969 the Sudanese Army consisted of about 26,500 men, four infantry brigades of four battalions each, three independent infantry battalions, one armoured regiment, a parachute regiment, an armoured regiment and three artillery regiments. After independence, British advisers helped train the Army and Air Force, and British equipment predominated in the ground forces. There were 50 Alvis Saladins, 60 Ferret armoured cars, and 45 Commando armoured cars, about 50 25-pounders, 40 105-mm howitzers, 20 120-mm mortars, and 80 Bofors 40-mm guns.

On May 25, 1969, several young officers, led by Colonel Jaafar Nimeiry, seized power, thus bringing the army into political control for the second time. From 1969 until 1971, a military government - the National Revolutionary Command Council, composed of nine young officers and one civilian - exercised authority over a largely civilian cabinet. The council represented only a faction within the military establishment. From 1971 Nimeiri led a more civilian-based government. The first civil war ended in a negotiated settlement in 1973 by General Ismail. Sudan sent a brigade with infantry and supporting elements to the Sinai peninsula as a reinforcement to the Egyptian forces during the 1973 Yom Kippur War. It arrived too late, on October 28, 1973 and saw no fighting.

Diplomatic and military relations with Britain and other Western nations were broken after the June 1967 Arab–Israeli War, and the breach was filled by close military cooperation with the Soviet Union. Soviet assistance coincided with a dramatic expansion in Sudan Armed Forces personnel from 18,000 in 1966 to nearly 50,000 by 1972. The bulk of the equipment used by the ground and air forces throughout the 1970s until the early 1980s was of Soviet manufacture, including tanks, artillery, and MiG combat aircraft.

The Second Sudanese Civil War broke out again in 1982 and continued until 2005. The Armed Forces operated under the authority of the People's Armed Forces Act 1986.

Al-Bashir era 
By the time of the coup in 1989, over fifty percent of most Army units were staffed by soldiers and NCOs from the South. Most had little commitment or dedication to the government - they joined for the sugar and other rations given to soldiers, as well as the salary. Although they often acquitted themselves well in battle, generally surrendering only when their food and ammunition were depleted, they had little stomach for offensive operations. Under President Omar al-Bashir who seized power in the 1989 coup, armed forces under the government of Sudan included the Land Forces, the Sudanese Navy, the Sudanese Air Force, and the Popular Defence Forces, which were formed in 1989.

The Land Forces were "basically a light infantry force in 1991, supported by specialized elements. ...[C]ontrol extended from the headquarters of the general staff in Khartoum to the six regional commands (central, eastern, western, northern, southern, and Khartoum). Each regional command was organized along divisional lines. Thus, the Fifth Division was at Al-Ubayyid in Kurdufan (Central Command), the Second Division was at Khashm El Girba (Eastern Command), the Sixth Division was assigned to Al-Fashir in Darfur (Western Command), the First Division was at Juba (Southern Command), and the Seventh Armoured Division was at As Shajarah just south of Khartoum (Khartoum Command). The Airborne Division was based at Khartoum International Airport. The Third Division was located in the north, although no major troop units were assigned to it. Each division had a liaison officer attached to general headquarters in Khartoum to facilitate the division's communication with various command elements. This organisational structure did not provide an accurate picture of actual troop deployments. All of the divisions were understrength. The Sixth Division in Darfur was a reorganised brigade with only 2,500 personnel. Unit strengths varied widely. Most brigades were composed of 1,000 to 1,500 troops." Keegan, writing in 1983, indicated that the northern command was located at Shendi.

To reduce the pressure on the regular armed forces, the Sudanese government made extensive use of militias, such as the South Sudan Defence Forces. This largely symbolic coalition of seven groups was formed with the signing of the Khartoum Peace Agreement with the NIF in 1997. The SSDF was led by former Garang lieutenant Riek Machar.

In 2004, the Federal Research Division of the Library of Congress estimated that the Popular Defence Forces, the military wing of the National Islamic Front, consisted of 10,000 active members, with 85,000 reserves. The Popular Defence Forces were deployed alongside regular army units against various rebel groups. In 2005, in accordance with the provisions of the Naivasha Comprehensive Peace Accord, Joint Integrated Units were formed together with the rebels of the Sudan People's Liberation Army. In this regard, Afdevinfo did report that the 1st Division at Juba had been disbanded.

In 2007 the IISS estimated that the SAF had 104,800 personnel supported by 17,500 paramilitary personnel. Jane's Information Group said in May 2009 that 'There are a number of infantry divisions, divided among [the six] regional commands. The commander of each military region traditionally commanded the divisional and brigade commanders within his territory. It is understood that there are six infantry divisions and seven independent infantry brigades; a mechanised division and an independent mechanised infantry brigade; and an armoured division. Other elements are understood to include a Special Forces battalion with five companies; an airborne division and a border guard brigade. Support elements include an engineer division.' Jane's reported the army's strength as 100,000 plus militias.

Jane's Sentinel reports that there are two engineer brigades supporting the 9th Airborne Division. Jane's Amphibious and Special Forces, 2010, listed the 9th Airborne Division headquartered in Khartoum which includes two airborne brigades and the 144th Special Forces Battalion, an anti-terrorist unit. It also mentioned the two engineer brigades for special forces support. The 9th Airborne Division carried out projects north of the capital in 2022; in JAnuary 2022 it confronted demonstrators in Omdurman. In 2010 it was reported that a Republican Guard existed as a presidential security unit, led by Major General Khalid Hamad.

The SAF and government-aligned militias have fought in the Sudanese Civil War, the Darfur Conflict, the Sudan–SPLM-N conflict and the 2012 South Sudan-Sudan border conflict. As part of the Yemeni Civil War, dozens of Sudanese soldiers were reported killed in an ambush by Houthis in Hajjah Governorate in April 2018.

Joint Integrated Units 2005-2011 
The 2005 Comprehensive Peace Agreement which ended the second civil war, stated that '...there shall be formed Joint/Integrated Units during the Pre-Interim and Interim Period from the SAF and the Sudan People’s Liberation Army (SPLA).' 'These shall form the nucleus of the future Sudanese National Armed Forces, should the result of the referendum... confirm unity of the country, [otherwise] the JIUs shall dissolve with each component reverting to its mother Armed Forces.'

The JIUs were to consist of: (Chapter VI, Security Arrangements, Paragraphs 20.13.2.1 and 20.13.2.2)
1st Infantry Division which shall have a total strength of 9000 officers, NCOs, and men and shall be deployed in Equatoria area
2nd Infantry Division which shall have a total strength of 8000 officers, NCOs, and men and shall be deployed in Upper Nile area
3rd Infantry Division which shall have a total strength of 7000 officers, NCOs, and men and shall be deployed in Bahr El Ghazal area
4th Infantry Division (unlike the other divisions, both 4th and 5th Divisions are under-strength divisions) which shall have a total strength of 6000 officers, NCOs, and men and shall be deployed in southern Blue Nile area
5th Infantry Division which shall have a total strength of 6000 officers, NCOs, and men and shall be deployed in Southern Kordofan/Nuba Mountains
Independent Brigade which shall be deployed in Khartoum with the total strength of 3000 officers, NCOs, and men
There shall be formed a JIU Infantry Battalion for Abyei Area

According to the Catholic "Voice of Hope" radio station in Wau, the Salam Forces military of Major-General Eltom Elnur Daldoum, who has a Misseriya background and operated in the Deim Zubeir area, joined the Sudan Armed Forces and became part of the Joint Integrated Units in Wau during the interim period. The number of his fighters was estimated at 400.

After its formation, the Joint Defence Board (JDB) met for the first time in January 2006. The Board was jointly chaired by SAF and SPLA lieutenant generals. The National Assembly passed the Joint Integrated Units Act on 17 January 2006. The JIUs were commanded by SPLA Major General Thomas Cirillo Swaka. But in the face of high hopes, the three most serious breaches of the CPA’s permanent  ceasefire resulted directly from the actions of JIU battalions and brigades. North/South distrust resulted in the JDB struggling to providing oversight and management of the JIUs.

With the dissolution of the JIUs following the Southern Sudanese independence referendum, 2011, the SPLA components were either integrated back into the SPLA or demobilised. The SPLA components however were seen as less of a concern than the SAF components. Many of the SAF JIU personnel were former militia ('Other Armed Groups' or OAGs) who were 'aligned' rather than being formally 'incorporated' within the Sudanese Army. 'Aside from regular SAF units in locations such as Malakal and Bor, many of the SAF elements of the JIUs hail from the areas where they are serving and have strong family ties in these locations. As with the SPLA components, integration into the SPLA or increased incentives to demobilize are the only options the SAF components are likely to consider—movement north being out of the question.'

After Al-Bashir's fall (2019-onwards) 
On 11 April 2019, the Sudanese Armed Forces launched a coup against Omar al-Bashir after months of protests against his rule. On 3 June 2019, the Sudanese Armed Forces, led by the Rapid Support Forces carried out the Khartoum massacre, leaving over 128 people dead.

Article 10.(a) of the August 2019 Draft Constitutional Declaration stated that the mixed civilian–military "Sovereignty Council [was] the head of state, the symbol of its sovereignty and unity, and the Supreme Commander of the armed forces, Rapid Support Forces, and other uniformed forces." Article 34.(a) states that the "armed forces and Rapid Support Forces are a national military institution that protect the unity and sovereignty of the nation" and Article 34.(b) states that the relationship between the military institution and executive authority is to be organised by the "Armed Forces Law and the Rapid Support Forces Law".

On 28 October 2019, the chair of the Sovereignty Council, Abdel Fattah al-Burhan, issued a decree appointing a new military top-level command, called the General Staff, including Lt. Gen. Mohamed Osmana al-Hassan as Chief of General Satff; Lt. Gen. Abdallah al-Matari Hamid, Inspector General of the Armed Forces; several Deputy Chiefs of Staff; Lt. Gen. Essam Mohamed-Hassan Karar as commander-in-chief of the land forces; Rear Admiral Mahjoub Bushra Ahmed Rahma as commander of the naval forces; Lt. Gen.l Essam al-Din Said Koko as commander-in-chief of the Air Force (and Major General Abdel Khair Abdallah Nasser Darjam as Commander of the Air Defense Forces). Sudan Tribune interpreted the changes in military leadership as a strategy by al-Burhan to "tighten his grip on the army after the removal of Islamist generals."

Education and training 
The Military College at Wadi Sayyidna, near Omdurman, had been Sudan's primary source of officer training since it opened in 1948. A two-year program, emphasizing study in political and military science and physical training, led to a commission as a second lieutenant in the SPAF. In the late 1970s and early 1980s, an average of 120 to 150 officers were graduated from the academy each year. In the late 1950s, roughly 60 graduated each year, peaking to more than 500 in early 1972 as a result of mobilisation brought on by the first southern rebellion. Students from other Arab and African countries were also trained at the Military College, and in 1982 sixty Ugandans were graduated as part of a Sudanese contribution to rebuilding the Ugandan army after Amin's removal from power.

Equipment
The Sudanese Armed Forces today are equipped mainly with Soviet, Russian, Chinese, Ukrainian, and Sudanese manufactured weaponry. They have a weapons production company called the Military Industry Corporation. Significant data has been made available by the UN Experts' Groups on the Sudan on arms supplies to Sudanese forces.

The proliferation of small arms in Sudan originated during the occupation of the country by Ottoman and Egyptian forces and by the colonial powers, especially Britain and France, in the late nineteenth and early twentieth centuries. Sudan had only a limited arms industry until the late 1990s, except for a production line for small-caliber ammunition. Consequently, foreign sources for weapons, equipment, ammunition, and technical training have been indispensable. The standard issue battle rifle is now an H&K G3 variant that is domestically manufactured by Military Industry Corporation and referred to as the Dinar.

The IISS reported in 2007 that the SAF had 200 T-54/55 main battle tanks and 70 Type 62 light tanks. By 2011 the total that the IISS listed was 360: 20 M-60, 60 Type 59, 270 T-54/55, and 10 'Al Bashier' (Type-85-IIM). The 'Al-Bashier' is a licensed version of the Type 85M-II tank. In addition, the 'Digna'a modernisation programme for the T-55 has been reported. Chinese Type 96 tanks have also been known to serve in the Sudanese Army. These are by far and away Sudan's most modern and powerful tanks.

The IISS reported 218 armoured cars (6 French Panhard AML-90, 60 BRDM-2, 80 British Ferret, and 30 British Alvis Saladin) in 2007, alongside 15 Soviet BMP-2. Also reported were 42 US M-113, 19 US LAV-150/V-100 Commando, Soviet BTR-152/BTR-50, 20 Czech or Polish OT-62/OT-64. 104 Egyptian Walid were ordered in 1981-1986.

The IISS estimated in 2011 that Sudan had 778+ artillery pieces, including 20 US M-101, 16 D-30, Soviet D-74, Soviet M-30, and 75 Soviet 130mm M-46/Type-59-I. The IISS estimated in 2011 that the Army had 20 pieces of self-propelled artillery, including 10 Soviet 2S1 Gvozdika and 10 French (AMX) Mk F3. Multiple rocket launchers in service include the Soviet 122mm BM-21 Grad and the Chinese PHL-81.

Also reported in 2013 were Soviet M43 mortars (120mm). Anti-tank and anti-aircraft weapons reported included a number of British-made Swingfire, 54 Soviet 9K32 Strela-2 (SA-7 Grail), and a large number of various anti-aircraft guns.

T-72 main battle tanks, FB-6A mobile air defense systems, 9K33 Osa mobile air defence systems, and WS1 and WS2 MRLS have also been spotted with the Sudanese armed forces.

Armored vehicles are produced, maintained, and repaired at the Elshaheed Ibrahim Shams el Deen Complex in Khartoum.

Air Force 

The Sudanese Air Force operates Mil Mi-24 attack helicopters, Karakuram K-8 training aircraft, MiG-29 fighters, and Su-25, Su-24, F-5, and Nanchang Q-5 'Fantan' fighter-attack aircraft. Soon after agreeing in November 1976 to provide Sudan with selected arms, the United States sold Sudan transport aircraft, a purchase financed by Saudi Arabia, followed several years later by F–5 combat aircraft.

A long-established training centre and airbase is at Wadi Sayyidna, where No. 2 Fighter-Attack Squadron SuAF operated J-7s for a period.

The Armed Forces have suffered significant numbers of senior personnel killed in several aircraft crashes, in 2001, and in August 2012.

Navy

A visit by Josip Broz Tito, the President of Yugoslavia, to Sudan in 1959 helped build the impetus to create the Sudanese Navy. Yugoslavia was instrumental in the founding, training, and supply of vessels for the Sudanese Navy. Yugoslavia initially provided four coastal patrol boats. It was eventually established in 1962 to operate on the Red Sea coast and the River Nile.

In 1971, British Defence Intelligence said the Navy comprised six patrol craft, two landing craft, and three auxiliary vessels with its base at Port Sudan.
In 1999, estimated naval strength was 1,300 officers and men.  Reported bases were at Port Sudan and Flamingo Bay on the Red Sea and at Khartoum. The navy had two 70-ton, 75-foot, Kadir-class coastal patrol craft (Kadir [129] and Karari [130]), both transferred from Iran to Sudan in 1975, as well as sixteen inshore patrol craft and two supply ships:
4 Kurmuk class patrol boats
1 Swiftship type patrol boat
2 ex-Yugoslav patrol boats (Kraljevica class)
3 Sewart type patrol craft
2 Sobat class amphibious/Transport/Supply boats

The navy, according to 2004 estimates from the International Institute for Strategic Studies, had 1,800 personnel, and a base at Marsa Gwayawi on the Red Sea. By 2017 IISS estimates for navy personnel had fallen to 1,300.

Foreign military assistance 
Relations with the Soviets cooled in the late 1970s, and Sudan turned to China and Britain for training and equipment. In addition, Sudan received financing from Arab states, particularly Saudi Arabia, for the purchase of Western equipment. Until 1985, however, Sudan’s closest military ties were with Egypt, defined by a 25-year defense agreement signed in 1976. The accord provided for shared planning and staffing; the Egyptians also supplied Sudan with ammunition and various types of weaponry, such as antitank missiles and armored personnel carriers. Al-Bashir reaffirmed the pact after his 1989 coup, but the Egyptians declined to supply additional military aid after Sudan refused to condemn the Iraqi invasion of Kuwait in 1990.

U.S. military aid to Sudan initially consisted primarily of training a small number of Sudanese officers. Between fiscal year (FY) 1979 and FY 1982, military sales credits rose from US$5 million to US$100 million. Apart from aircraft, the United States provided Sudan with artillery, armored personnel carriers, Commando armored cars, and M–60 tanks. U.S. grant aid reached a peak of US$101 million in FY 1982. Sudan granted the United States naval facilities at Port Sudan and gave the United States Central Command some airport-prepositioning rights for military equipment for contingent use. In 1981 and 1983, Sudanese and U.S. forces participated in the multi-national Exercise Bright Star maneuvers.

The United States reduced military grants and credits when the Southern Sudanese civil war resumed in 1983. After FY 1987, no assistance was extended with the exception of less than US$1 million annually for advanced training for SAF officers and maintenance for previously supplied equipment. Washington suspended military aid in 1989 under a provision of the United States Foreign Assistance Act that prohibits assistance to countries in arrears on interest payments on previous loans. In March 1990, the United States invoked a provision of the act barring aid to regimes that overthrow a democratic government. The United States terminated arms sales to Sudan in late 1992, while the European Union instituted an arms embargo against Sudan in 1994. These actions, however, had no impact on Sudan’s ability to replenish its arsenals.

According to the U.S. Arms Control and Disarmament Agency, Sudan obtained about US$350 million in military arms and equipment between 1983 and 1988. The United States was the largest supplier, accounting for US$120 million. China and France each provided US$30 million and Britain, US$10 million. About US$160 million came from unidentified sources, probably largely from Egypt and Libya, and as purchases from other Western suppliers financed by Arab countries.

Various Middle East and Gulf countries, particularly Iran and Libya but also Egypt, provided more than US$2 billion in “economic aid” in the 1970s, much of which Khartoum used to buy weapons. Additionally, each of Sudan’s neighbors provided weapons and/or sanctuary to various anti-Khartoum rebel groups and militias. Since the early 1990s, at least 34 countries have exported ammunition, light arms, and small arms to Sudan. In more recent years, reliable sources have suggested that there were between 1.9 and 3.2 million small arms in Sudan. About one-fifth of these weapons were held by the Sudanese government and/or pro-Khartoum militias.

Sudan constituted one of Africa’s major consumers of weapons in the early 2000s. As was the case in earlier decades, Sudan continued to rely on an array of suppliers, among them Belarus, China, Egypt, Iran, Romania, Russia, Poland, and South Africa, for ammunition, armored vehicles, helicopters, howitzers, infantry fighting vehicles, attack and fighter aircraft, multiple rocket launchers, main battle tanks, and transport aircraft. Additionally, China supervised arms assembly and assisted in the construction of weapons factories.

Sudan manufactured at least a small amount of ammunition for light weapons in the early 1960s, but the country’s capacity to produce arms greatly expanded with the opening of the GIAD industrial city south of Khartoum in October 2000. Under the auspices of the Military Industry Corporation within the Ministry of Defense, engineering and industrial enterprises produced or imported a range of equipment and technology for ground and air forces. Although information was limited, in the early 2000s this equipment included heavy and light artillery, antitank and antiaircraft guns, machine guns and small arms, tanks, and armored personnel carriers, as well as ammunition for these weapons; the country also had acquired the ability to assemble and maintain aircraft, including fighter and cargo airplanes and helicopters.

The SPLM/A, under the late John Garang’s leadership, regularly accused the SAF of using chemical weapons in South Sudan, but these allegations were never substantiated. The same was true of the U.S. charge in 1998 that the Al-Shifa Pharmaceuticals Industries factory in Khartoum North was developing chemical weapons or precursor chemicals, a claim that led to the United States bombing of the plant. Similarly, news reports in 2004 that Sudanese and Syrian troops had tested chemical weapons against civilians in Darfur were never confirmed. Some independent observers maintain that Garang on his part used the chemical-weapons issue as a disinformation campaign against Khartoum and Washington.

Notes

References 
 
 
 Cookson, John A. U.S. Army Area Handbook for the Republic of the Sudan Department of the Army Pamphlet No. 550-27. Department of the Army, Foreign Areas Studies Division.
  
  (see author link Ruth First)
 
 
 
 
 
 
 
 
 
 
 
  (November 2010)
 
 
 
 

Attribution:

Further reading

Bienen, H.S., and J. Moore, 'The Sudan Military Economic Corporations,' Armed Forces and Society Vol. 13, No. 4, 1987, pp. 489–516
 Mohamed Ahmed Karar's book, Al-Jaysh Al-Sudani Wa Al-Inqaaz "The popular army and the NRC" translated as 'The Sudanese Army and National Salvation' (Khartoum, Sudan: Dar Al-Balad Publisher, 1990)
Jago Salmon, A Paramilitary Revolution: The Popular Defence Forces, Small Arms Survey HSBA Working Paper No.10, December 2007
Small Arms Survey, Joint Integrated Units
US Army Area Handbook for the Republic of Sudan, Dept of the Army Pamphlet No 550-27, Second Edition, 1964
‘New War, Old Enemies: Conflict Dynamics in South Kordofan’, by Claudio Gramizzi and Jérôme Tubiana, now available for downloading at  

Military of Sudan

he:צבא דרום סודאן